The Dandenong Creek (Aboriginal Bunwurrung: Narra Narrawong or Dandinnong) is an urban creek of the Port Phillip catchment, located in the eastern and south-eastern Greater Melbourne region of the Australian east coast state of Victoria.

The first European to see the creek near its source was in 1839 and is believed to be Daniel Bunce, a botanist.

Etymology
The traditional custodians of the land surrounding what is now known as the Dandenong Creek were the indigenous Bunurong people of the Kulin nation who referred to the creek as Narra Narrawong; while others gave the creek the name Dandenong, sometimes spelled as Dand-y-non or Tanjenong by early settlers, believed to mean "high" or "lofty".

Course
 
 

Dandenong Creek has its headwaters in the Dandenong Ranges near Olinda, sourced by a series of springs and small runoff streams within the Dandenong Ranges National Park. The creek can be roughly separated into three sections:
 The Upper Dandenong starts at the Olinda town center and first flows westwards between Mount Dandenong and The Basin, picking up its first significant tributary, the Dobson Creek, near a retarding basin just west of the junction among The Basin, Kilsyth, Kilsyth South and Boronia. It continues further west as the boundary between several adjacent suburbs, picking up Little Bungalook and Tarralla-Bungalook Creek before turning southwards at the junction between Ringwood, Vermont and Wantirna, roughly where EastLink crosses.
 The Middle Dandenong starts at the mouth of the small Heatherdale Creek just west of EastLink, and then flows meandrously to the south, joined by the Blind Creek (near Jells Park) and Corhanwarrabul Creek (at the Tirhatuan Wetlands). It then crosses over to the east side of the EastLink and courses southeastly towards the western edge of the Churchill National Park, crossing the namesaked Dandenong Valley Highway (Stud Road) in the process. After draining a series of greenspace reserves known as the Dandenong Valley Parklands, the creek reaches a former police paddock in Endeavour Hills and turns more southwardly as the boundary between Dandenong North and Endeavour Hill, and the surrounding riparian zones and associated runoff catchment are known as the Dandenong Wetlands. It then continues further south as the northern half of the boundary between Dandenong and Doveton.
 The Lower Dandenong starts just upstream of the Clow Street bridge in Dandenong East, where the creek becomes concrete-lined throughout almost its entire course within Dandenong.  It first turns westwards at Dandenong Park, looping shortly northwest before crossing Princes Highway and the Pakenham/Cranbourne railway line, then continues further westwards south of the Dandenong town center until it picks up the Mile Creek (its last de jure tributary) near the junction of EastLink and Dandenong Bypass. It then turns south again and courses alongside the EastLink's east side as the boundary between Dandenong South and Keysborough, crossing over to the west side of the EastLink again about  before giving off Mordialloc Creek near the tri-suburban junction with Bangholme at the Perry Road bridge.  It then flows southwestly into Bangholme for another  before reaching its confluence with the Eumemmerring Creek to form the partly man-made Patterson River, which continues southwest through Bangholme, Patterson Lakes, Bonbeach and Carrum and drains into the Beaumaris Bay, a small eastern bight of Port Phillip Bay north of the Mornington Peninsula.

Tributaries 
 Dobson Creek (left) — headwaters in Sassafras, confluence in northern The Basin (near Liverpool Road Retarding Basin)
 Little Bungalook Creek (right) — headwaters in southern Kilsyth, confluence in southwestern Kilsyth South)
 Bungalook Creek (right) — headwaters in Montrose, joined by Tarralla Creek (headwaters in southern Croydon) in western Bayswater North, confluence in Heathmont
 Heatherdale Creek (right) — headwaters in southwestern Ringwood, confluence in eastern Vermont
 Blind Creek (left) — headwaters in Wantirna South (near Westfield Knox), confluence in northwestern Scoresby (at Jells Park)
 Corhanwarrabul Creek (left) — headwaters in southern Ferny Creek (namesaked from the creek's upper section), joined by Monbulk Creek (headwaters in southern Kallista) between southern Knoxfield and northern Rowville, confluence in southwestern Rowville (at Tirhatuan Wetlands)
 Mile Creek (right) — headwaters from urban runoffs in northern Springvale, eastern Clayton and western Mulgrave, joined by Yarraman Creek (headwaters from two ponds/retarding basins in southern Noble Park North) in eastern Noble Park (near Yarraman railway station), confluence between southwestern Dandenong and eastern Keysborough
 Eumemmerring Creek (left) — headwaters in western Belgrave South, joined by numerous drains from the Lysterfield Lake, Hallam Main Drain (which drains parts of Berwick, Narre Warren, Narre Warren South, Hampton Park and Dandenong South) and Eastern Contour Drain (which drains parts of Sandhurst, Lyndhurst, Lynbrook and Dandenong South), confluence at Bangholme to form the Patterson River (near the Eastern Treatment Plant)

Distributary 
 Mordialloc Creek — branching off the right bank of Dandenong Creek at the tri-suburban junction of Keysborough, Bangholme and Dandenong South (near Perry Road bridge), flowing west/northwest as the boundary between Keysborough, Bangholme, Waterways, Braeside and Aspendale Gardens, picking up the drainage runoff from the Smythes Drain, Waterways Lake and Lagoons, Dunlops Drain (formed from Old Dandenong Road Drain and Dingley Drain), Mordialloc Settlement Drain, Heatherton Drain and the Edithvale Wetlands Drain before emptying into Beaumaris Bay between Mordialloc and Aspendale.

Ecology 

The series of open space reserves along the Dandenong Creek and its tributaries provide important habitat for many urban wildlife in the outer suburbs. The creek is also the home of one of the largest remaining populations of Yarra Gum, and a series of linear parks, nature reserves and wetlands are located along it.  A bike path known as the Dandenong Creek Trail runs alongside for a significant distance.

The health of the creek in these urban areas ranges from moderate to very poor and has been the focus of a number of clean-up campaigns in recent years. This drain runs underground for much of its course, running in a westerly direction and servicing several industrial estates in the catchment of Dandenong Creek. The tributary is commonly contaminated with plastic litterings and heavy metals, and authorities have made several attempts to prevent pollution which spreads downstream into Dandenong Creek.

Creek crossings 
The list below notes current bridges that cross over the Dandenong Creek. Some are road and rail bridges, whilst others are pedestrian and equestrian crossings.

Patterson River to Dandenong Valley Parklands

Dandenong Valley Parklands

Dandenong Valley Parklands to Mount Dandenong

See also

References

External links
 Returning Dandenong Creek project
 First Friends of Dandenong Creek website

Melbourne Water catchment
Rivers of Greater Melbourne (region)
Dandenong, Victoria
City of Greater Dandenong
City of Monash
City of Knox
City of Maroondah
City of Casey
Yarra Ranges